Horseshoe run was a shipping route in Australia.

Horeshoe Run may also refer to:

 Horse Shoe Run, West Virginia, an unincorporated community
 Horseshoe Run (Cheat River), a stream in West Virginia

See also
 Horseshoe route, a World War II flying boat route